Compagni, Cittadini, Fratelli, Partigiani is the third EP released by the Italian punk/art rock band CCCP Fedeli alla linea. It was first released on vinyl by Attack Punk Records and re-released on CD by Virgin Records along with the Ortodossia II EP. Its title comes from the first verse of the 1960 ballad "Per i Morti di Reggio Emilia" by the Italian composer Fausto Amodei, which is dedicated to the demonstrators killed by the police during a protest against the Tambroni government.

Track listing 
 "Militanz" — 1:59
 "Sono Come Tu Mi Vuoi" — 4:30
 "Morire" — 3:24
 "Emilia Paranoica" — 7:45

Personnel 
 Giovanni Lindo Ferretti - vocals
 Massimo Zamboni - guitar
 Umberto Negri - bass guitar, drum machine
 Danilo Fatur - Artista del popolo
 Annarella Giudici - Benemerita soubrette

See also
 CCCP discography
 Consorzio Suonatori Indipendenti (C.S.I.)
 Per Grazia Ricevuta (PGR)
 Punk rock

CCCP Fedeli alla linea albums
1985 EPs